Colorado Ultraviolet Transit Experiment (CUTE) is a small UV space telescope to study selected exoplanets.

It was launched as a rideshare on the Atlas V that launched Landsat 9 on September 27, 2021. It should operate for at least 7 months and study 10 exoplanets.

CUTE can measure near-UV (255-330 nm) and do low resolution spectroscopy of atmospheric tracers (eg. Fe II, Mg II, Mg I, OH).

The UV sensor is a 2048 x 515 pixel CCD array, with the spectrum lengthwise across the sensor. The 515 pixel width provides tolerance from sensor damage.

See also
 Ultraviolet astronomy

References

External links
 CUTE homepage
 Instrument Design Overview

Ultraviolet telescopes
Space telescopes
Spacecraft launched in 2021
Exoplanet search projects